Nevsky District is a district of the federal city of St. Petersburg, Russia. As of the 2010 Census, its population was 466,013; up from 438,061 recorded in the 2002 Census.

Geography
The district is the only one in St. Petersburg to lie on both banks of the Neva River.  It borders with Krasnogvardeysky and Tsentralny Districts in the north, Vsevolozhsky District of Leningrad Oblast in the east, Kolpinsky District in the southeast, and with Frunzensky District in the west.

History
The district was established in 1917.

Municipal divisions
Nevsky District comprises the following nine municipal okrugs:
#54
Ivanovsky
Narodny
Nevskaya Zastava
Nevsky
Obukhovsky
Okkervil
Pravoberezhny
Rybatskoye

References

Notes

Sources

 
Alexander Nevsky